Tumula is a monotypic moth genus of the family Erebidae. Its only species, Tumula flavicollis, is found in northern Thailand. Both the genus and the species were first described by Michael Fibiger in 2010.

The wingspan is about 10 mm. Most of the parts of the body of the moth: the head, patagia, tegulae, prothorax, basal part of the costa of the forewing, the upper part of the medial area and all of the terminal area, including the fringes are blackish brown. The forewing ground colour is light yellow. The crosslines are untraceable, except for some black dots along the terminal line. The hindwing is grey, with a discal spot and the underside of the forewing is grey, while the underside of the hindwing is light grey, with a discal spot.

References

Micronoctuini
Monotypic moth genera